St Swithun's Church is a Grade II listed church in the town of Bournemouth, England.

History 
St Swithuns is a work of Richard Norman Shaw constructed in the 1870s, and was one of the towns two central churches with St Michael's Church.

In 2014, St Swithun's became an Anglican church. In 2020, the church received a government grant.

Gallery

See also 
 List of churches in Bournemouth

References 

Church of England church buildings in Dorset
19th-century Church of England church buildings
Churches in Bournemouth
Grade II listed churches in Dorset
1877 establishments in England
Churches completed in 1877